The Trondhjem–Støren Line was Trøndelag's first railway. It opened in 1864, ten years after the Trunk Line between Oslo and Eidsvoll opened. The 49 kilometer long (later 51.1 km) railway line was narrow gauged and went between Trondheim and the Støren village in Midtre Gauldal municipality in the county of Sør-Trøndelag, Norway. The railway had its station, Trondhjem Kalvskinnet Station, in Prinsens gate, crossed the Nidelva river on a newly constructed railroad bridge to Elgeseter, the Elgeseter Bridge.

In 1877 the line was joined with the Røros Line, which went through the Østerdalen between Røros and Hamar. In 1884 the railway tracks were relocated to the west side of the Nidelva and joined with the Meråker Line and the new railway station at Brattøra, which had opened in 1882. This went through a tunnel at Nidareid to Brattøra. In 1918 new tracks were laid to Heimdal over Selsbakk.

Gauge conversion 

In 1921 the railway was converted to standard gauge and became a part of the Dovre Line.

See also 
 Rail transport in Norway
 List of gauge conversions
 Narrow gauge railways in Norway

References 

Railway lines in Trøndelag
Railway lines in Norway
Dovre Line
Røros Line
Railway lines opened in 1864
1864 establishments in Norway